Marc Richard Williams (born 27 July 1988) is a Welsh footballer who  plays as a forward for Llandudno.

Career
Williams came through the youth system at Wrexham and made his first-team debut in January 2006 against Rushden & Diamonds, in which he and his brother became the seventh pair of brothers to represent Wrexham. In the following month, he made his debut for the Wales Under-21 side against Northern Ireland Under-21. He scored two goals in his next game for the Welsh Under-21 side against Israel Under-21 in August 2006. Williams signed a new contract with Wrexham in summer of 2006 and made 17 league and cup appearances for Wrexham in the 2006–07 season. He made a further 23 league and cup appearances in the 2007–08 season as Wrexham were relegated from the Football League.

Williams contributed to Wrexham's bid to return to the Football League with 15 goals (13 league and two cup) including a hat trick against Eastbourne Borough on 20 December 2008. However, on 28 February 2009, he suffered a broken foot in a match against Salisbury City, which ruled him out for the remainder of the season. After injury disrupted the majority of Williams' 2009–10 season, he was handed a six-month deal to prove his fitness. However, with the arrival of Andy Morrell, he found himself out of favour at the club and instead joined Kidderminster Harriers on loan in August 2010, scoring on his debut in a 4–3 defeat to Southport.

He signed for Chester on 20 February 2012 on a deal which takes him to the end of the season. Marc scored his first 2 goal's for Chester in the 3–2 victory over Bradford Park Avenue both before half time. He added his third Chester goal in the 2–0 victory at Chorley. In the club's final league game of the season Marc opened the scoring in a 4–0 win over Marine. At the end of the 2012 season, Marc signed a 1-year professional contract with Chester.

He was released by the club on 22 May 2013 after he was not offered a new contract. Marc said he was 'shocked and massively disappointed' after not being offered new terms. He left Chester with 14 goals and 60 appearances in all competitions within one and half season. He spent a short spell with Northwich Victoria F.C. before joining Colwyn Bay in October 2013.

In 2015 Williams joined Welsh Premier League side Llandudno, helping them to a top three finish in their first season in the division and was named Welsh Premier League player of the season.

Williams signed for Bangor City in 2018.

On 30 January 2019, Williams joined Welsh Premier League club Aberystwyth Town. In 2018–19, he scored four goals in ten games for Aberystwyth.

On 10 May 2019, Aberystwyth announced Williams had committed for the 2019–20 season along with Portuguese midfielder Paulo Mendes. Williams was appointed captain of Aberystwyth Town for the 2019–20 season and scored two goals on the opening day in a 3–2 win against rivals Carmarthen Town.

In June 2020, Williams signed a new one year contract with Aberystwyth keeping him at the club for the 2020–21 season.

In June 2021, Williams returned to Llandudno.

Career statistics

Honours
 Welsh Premier League player of the year: 2015–16
 Welsh Premier League Team of the Year: 2015–16

References

External links

Marc Williams Profile at Wrexham FC

1988 births
Living people
People from Colwyn Bay
Sportspeople from Conwy County Borough
Welsh footballers
Association football forwards
Wales youth international footballers
Wales under-21 international footballers
Wales semi-pro international footballers
Wrexham A.F.C. players
Kidderminster Harriers F.C. players
Chester F.C. players
English Football League players
National League (English football) players
Northern Premier League players
Northwich Victoria F.C. players
Colwyn Bay F.C. players
Llandudno F.C. players
Cymru Premier players
Aberystwyth Town F.C. players
Bangor City F.C. players